Tony Hanson (October 20, 1955 – November 25, 2018) was an American basketball player. He was drafted by the New Orleans Jazz in the third round of the 1977 NBA draft.

Collegiate playing career
After a standout high school career at Holy Cross High School, Hanson attended the University of Connecticut playing under legendary coach Dee Rowe. In his junior season, they won the ECAC New England Championship as he guided the team to a Sweet 16 appearance. He was also the Yankee Conference Rookie of the Year in 1974. The next two seasons saw Hanson in the All-Yankee Conference First Team pick, both in 1975 and 1976. It was his senior year that gained him recognition, his double-double average of 26.0 points per game and 10.6 rebounds per contest leading him to be named New England Player of the Year and ECAC Player of the Year. His time playing for the Huskies has led him to third in career scoring among all Connecticut basketball players (1,990 points in total), and first in field goals with 784. His average of 26.0 points per game places him second. Hanson was named to the UConn Basketball All-Century Team in 2001 as well as its Huskies of Honor in 2007.

College statistics

|-
| style="text-align:left;"| 1973–74
| style="text-align:left;"| Connecticut
| 27 || – || – || .458 || – || .506 || 5.4 || 2.0 || – || – || 9.9
|-
| style="text-align:left;"| 1974–75
| style="text-align:left;"| Connecticut
| 28 || – || – || .480 || – || .681 || 6.5 || 2.2 || – || – || 16.7
|-
| style="text-align:left;"| 1975–76
| style="text-align:left;"| Connecticut
| 29 || – || – || .494 || – || .711 || 7.2 || 3.5 || – || – || 19.1
|-
| style="text-align:left;"| 1976–77
| style="text-align:left;"| Connecticut
| 27 || – || – || .523 || – || .757 || 10.5 || 3.0 || – || – || 26.0
|-
| style="text-align:left;"| Career
| style="text-align:left;"| 
| 111 || – || – || .494 || – || .699 || 7.3 || 2.7 || – || – || 17.9

1977 NBA draft
Following four successful years with Huskies, Hanson was picked by New Orleans Jazz in the third round of the 1977 NBA draft. He played preseason but due to Injury he continued his career in Europe.

European career
After not making the New Orleans Jazz first team, Hanson moved to Europe and had highly successful career in Italy, France, Northern Ireland and England. His endeavors in England led him to Tees Valley Mohawks, where he became coach after retirement winning countless trophies throughout the years with a star studded cast which featured UConn alumnus such as EJ Harrison a 1999 NCAA Championship winner.

Post-retirement
After retiring from basketball, Hanson set up Hoop Dreams Social Enterprise, utilizing his degree in Special Education to run an initiative to help young people with education problems, using basketball to aid them. He was also chairperson of Middlesbrough Black & Minority Ethnic Network, championing under represented ethnic groups in the UK. His charitable work led to him being awarded an MBE in 2007. Then culture secretary Tessa Jowell, who presented with Hanson the award, said of him, "Thanks to Mr Hanson's tireless efforts, thousands of young people in Tees Valley have benefited from the opportunities created by the Hoop Dreams Social Enterprise."

He was chairman of Tees Valley Mohawks Basketball Club, who compete in the top tier of English basketball. He died of a suspected heart attack on November 25, 2018 in Windham CT.

References

External links
Uconnhuskies.com

1955 births
2018 deaths
American expatriate basketball people in France
American expatriate basketball people in Ireland
American expatriate basketball people in Italy
American expatriate basketball people in the United Kingdom
American people of Jamaican descent
American men's basketball players
Basketball players from Connecticut
New Orleans Jazz draft picks
Sportspeople from Waterbury, Connecticut
UConn Huskies men's basketball players
Forwards (basketball)
Guards (basketball)